Two Hearts Beat as One (German: Zwei Herzen und ein Schlag) is a 1932 German musical film directed by Wilhelm Thiele and starring Lilian Harvey, Wolf Albach-Retty and Kurt Lilien. It was shot at the Babelsberg Studios in Berlin. The film's sets were designed by the art directors Werner Schlichting and Benno von Arent. A separate French-language version The Girl and the Boy was made, also starring Harvey.

Cast
 Lilian Harvey as Jenny Müller 
 Wolf Albach-Retty as Victor Müller 
 Kurt Lilien as Moritz  
 Tibor Halmay as Arpard von Nélemén  
 Franz Rott as Ernö Békeffy  
 Hermann Blaß as Advokat  
 Ernst Behmer 
 Hans Deppe
 Rudolf Biebrach
 William Huch
 Rosa Valetti
 Ina von Elben
 Otto Wallburg
 Gertrud Wolle

References

Bibliography 
 Bock, Hans-Michael & Bergfelder, Tim. The Concise CineGraph. Encyclopedia of German Cinema. Berghahn Books, 2009.

External links 
 

1932 films
1932 musical comedy films
German musical comedy films
Films of the Weimar Republic
1930s German-language films
Films directed by Wilhelm Thiele
German films based on plays
Films set in France
Films set in hotels
Films about singers
Films about divorce
German multilingual films
UFA GmbH films
German black-and-white films
Films produced by Erich Pommer
Films with screenplays by Franz Schulz
1932 multilingual films
1930s German films
Films shot at Babelsberg Studios